Qingliang Temple, also known as 
Stone Cooling Bodhimaṇḍa, literally means "cooling temple". The temple is located in Qingliangshan Park in the west of Nanjing City, Jiangsu, China.

History
The temple was formerly known as the Xingjiao Temple built by Xu Wen during Five Dynasties and Ten Kingdoms period. In the first year of the Southern Tang Dynasty (937), Li Jing (The 2nd ruler of Southern Tang) spent the summer at this place and modified the name of the temple to "Stone Cooling Bodhimaṇḍa".

Later, Li Yu (The 3er ruler of Southern Tang) left an inscription of "Deqing Hall" (德慶堂). Wenyi resides in this temple and builds Fayan school. 

The temple was rebuilt in 980 during the period of Northern Song Dynasty. In 1402 was rebuilt by Yongle Emperor of Ming Dynasty and was renamed "Qingliang Temple." After the Taiping Heavenly Kingdom, Second Sino-Japanese War, Cultural Revolution and other catastrophic damages. The temple was renovated in 2003 and opened in 2009.

See also
Qingliangshan Park
 Stone City, adjacent to Qingliangshan Park

Notes
1. Fayan school was one of the Five Houses of Chán, the major schools of Chinese Chán during the later Tang Dynasty.

References

External links
Qingliang Temple official website 

Buddhist temples in Nanjing